Franz Rieger (August 1895 – 1965) was a German painter. His work was part of the painting event in the art competition at the 1936 Summer Olympics.

References

1895 births
1965 deaths
20th-century German painters
20th-century German male artists
German male painters
Olympic competitors in art competitions
People from Munich